The 1926–27 NCAA championships were contested by the NCAA during the 1926–27 collegiate academic school year, the NCAA's sixth season of championships, to determine the team and individual national champions of its two sponsored sports.

Before the introduction of the separate University Division and College Division before the 1955–56 school year, a single national championship was conducted for each sport. Women's sports were not added until 1981–82.

Championships

Season results

Team titles, by university
No official team titles awarded this season

Cumulative results

Team titles, by university

References

1926 in American sports
1927 in American sports